Hartness State Airport  is a public airport located three miles (5 km) northwest of the central business district of Springfield, a town in Windsor County, Vermont, United States. It is owned by the State of Vermont.

History 
The airport was established by its namesake, James Hartness, who donated the land as the first airfield in Vermont. After his trans-Atlantic flight, Charles Lindbergh toured the United States in the Spirit of St. Louis to promote aviation. He landed in Springfield on July 26, 1927, in his visit to Vermont and spoke at a large gathering at the airport.

Facilities and aircraft 

For the 12-month period ending November 20, 2012, the airport had 6,600 aircraft operations, an average of 127 per week: 95% general aviation, 3% air taxi and 2% military. There are 37 aircraft based at this airport: 76% single engine, 22% gliders and 3% multi-engine.

References

External links 
Hartness State Airport at Vermont Airport Directory

Airports in Vermont
Buildings and structures in Springfield, Vermont
Transportation buildings and structures in Windsor County, Vermont